The Barra Olympic Park (Brazilian Portuguese: Parque Olímpico da Barra), originally the City of Sports Complex, is a cluster of nine sporting venues in Barra da Tijuca, in the west zone of Rio de Janeiro, Brazil. The park, which served as the Olympic Park for the 2016 Summer Olympics and the 2016 Summer Paralympics, was originally built for the 2007 Pan American Games, consisting of three venues. The complex was later expanded to nine venues for the Olympics, two of which are temporary structures. The complex will later become the site of the Olympic Training Center, after the games conclude.

History

The site of the Barra Olympic Park was formerly occupied by the Autódromo Internacional Nelson Piquet, also known as Jacarepaguá. It was a former Formula One circuit that hosted the Brazilian Grand Prix on a number of occasions throughout the 1980s, before the Grand Prix went back to its original home at the Autódromo José Carlos Pace, Interlagos, in 1990. Jacarepaguá was partly demolished to make way for the City of Sports Complex, a cluster of three venues constructed for the 2007 Pan American Games, held in Rio de Janeiro. The venues consisted the Maria Lenk Aquatic Center, which held diving, swimming and synchronized swimming events, the Rio Olympic Arena, which held basketball and artistic gymnastics events, and the Barra Velodrome, which held track cycling and speed roller skating events. Construction of the City of Sports was not without setbacks – the original plan for the complex called for a large-scale entertainment complex, valued at R$ 500 million and contracted to private firms for construction. These plans, however, fell through, and a smaller-scale plan for the complex was adopted instead. Opposition efforts by preservationists of the Jacarepaguá, the unsuitable soil at the construction site and numerous strike actions by workers delayed the venue's construction, which initially planned to begin in 2005, but was delayed until mid-2006. Despite these challenges, the venues were completed in time for the games in July 2007, and cost a relatively cheaper R$ 205 million to construct, with venues smaller than originally planned.

In 2009, Rio de Janeiro successfully bid to host the 2016 Summer Olympics and Paralympics. Plans for a new array of venues at the City of Sports, rebranded the Barra Olympic Park, along with the complete demolition of the Jacarepaguá, was in the works. The Barra Velodrome, however, was not approved by the International Cycling Union as an appropriate venue for track cycling events at the Olympics. It was decided that costs to upgrade the velodrome would be equally as expensive as building a new venue, thus the Rio Olympic Velodrome, built immediately west of the Rio Olympic Arena, was conceived, with the Barra Velodrome being demolished in 2013. Other new venues constructed for the Olympics include the Carioca Arenas, the Olympic Tennis Center, and the temporary Olympic Aquatics Stadium, built on the site of the former Barra Velodrome, and Future Arena venues.

Domestic broadcaster Rede Globo constructed a studio for its coverage of the Games in Barra Olympic Park.

Venues

Current
 Carioca Arena 1: basketball, wheelchair basketball, and wheelchair rugby (capacity: 16,000)
 Carioca Arena 2: wrestling, judo, and boccia (capacity: 10,000)
 Carioca Arena 3: fencing, taekwondo, paralympic judo, and paralympic fencing (capacity: 10,000)
 Future Arena: handball and goalball (capacity: 12,000)
 Maria Lenk Aquatics Center: diving, synchronised swimming, water polo (capacity: 5,000)
 Olympic Tennis Centre: tennis, wheelchair tennis and 5-a-side football (capacity: 10,000; Main Court)
 Jeunesse Arena: gymnastics and wheelchair basketball (capacity: 12,000)
 Rio Olympic Velodrome: track cycling (capacity: 5,000)
Former
 Barra Velodrome (capacity 5,000)
 Olympic Aquatics Stadium: swimming, synchronised swimming, water polo play-offs and paralympic swimming (capacity: 15,000)

Future and legacy
After the conclusion of the games, the site was intended to be repurposed to become the Olympic Training Center, a sports training facility operated by the Brazilian Ministry of Sports. The Olympic Aquatics Stadium will be dismantled and its parts to be used in the construction of two new swimming venues on the site - both 50m pools with capacities for 6,000 and 3,000 spectators, respectively. Carioca Arena 3 will become a sports school, with space for 850 full-time students, while Future Arena will be dismantled for its materials to be used in the construction of public schools across Rio de Janeiro.

Music
In 2017, it was announced that the Olympic Park will be the new site of the bi-annual music festival, Rock in Rio.

See also

Olympic Green
Queen Elizabeth Olympic Park
Athens Olympic Sports Complex
Seoul Olympic Park
Sydney Olympic Park
Centennial Olympic Park

References

 
Sports venues in Rio de Janeiro (city)
Venues of the 2007 Pan American Games
Venues of the 2016 Summer Olympics
Olympic Parks
Olympic International Broadcast Centres